Just Roll Tape: April 26, 1968 is a Stephen Stills demo album released in 2007. In the sleeve notes to the CD, Stephen Stills recalls that he was present at a Judy Collins session in New York in 1968, and when she finished with studio time remaining, Stills paid the engineer privately to let him record song demos. But Stills left the tapes in the studio and eventually considered them lost.

When the studio was about to close in 1978, musician Joe Colasurdo, who was rehearsing there, was told by the owner that he could take away any tapes he wanted to before they cleared the place out. After seeing Stills' names on several of the boxes, Colasurdo kept them safe until he could find a reel-to-reel machine to play them on.  Colasurdo began attempting to get the masters safely back into Stills's hands, an undertaking that took 25 years. In 2003, he was connected to Graham Nash after happening to meet a close friend of his named Dan Curland, who owns the Mystic Disc Record Store. Nash received the tapes, passed them on to Stills, encouraging him to release them.

Stills is the only musician on the album.  He sings all the songs and plays acoustic guitar and resonator guitar. "Treetop Flyer" is not from the 1968 sessions.

Note that Stills was performing at the Arizona State Fairgrounds in Phoenix, AZ as a member of Buffalo Springfield on the date referenced in the title. In a biography of Stills by David Roberts it has been suggested that the actual recording date was August 26, 1968.

Track listing

Personnel
 Stephen Stills - vocals, guitar, Dobro, producer
 John Haeny - recording engineer
 Joe Vitale, Jr. - digital engineer & mixing
 Joe Vitale - mixing on track 13
 John Hanlon - mixing and digital engineer track 13
 Steven Rhodes - assistant engineer
 John Nowland - digital transfers
 James Austin & Robin Hurley - A&R Supervision
 Marc Salata - production manager
 Graham Nash - photos
 Joe Halbardier & Steve Woolard - project assistance
 Elliot Roberts - direction

References

2007 albums
Stephen Stills albums
Rhino Records albums